Timothy James Bridgman (born 24 May 1985) is a British race car driver from England.

Bridgman was born in Harlow and educated at Felsted School. He raced for Jensen Motorsport in the Champ Car Atlantic Championship in 2006, finishing the season ranked 16th overall. He was the 2004 Formula BMW UK champion, and finished 15th in the 2005 British Formula 3 Championship.  He also won the 2007 Formula Palmer Audi Championship.

He competed in the Porsche Carrera Cup Great Britain, winning the 2009 title in a final-day three-way battle with James Sutton and Tim Harvey.

Racing record

Complete Porsche Supercup results
(key) (Races in bold indicate pole position) (Races in italics indicate fastest lap)

† — Did not finish the race, but was classified as he completed over 90% of the race distance.

External links
Tim Bridgman (official website)

English racing drivers
1985 births
People educated at Felsted School
Living people
Atlantic Championship drivers
British Formula Renault 2.0 drivers
Formula Palmer Audi drivers
Formula BMW UK drivers
British GT Championship drivers
Porsche Supercup drivers
Porsche Carrera Cup GB drivers

Hitech Grand Prix drivers
British Formula Three Championship drivers